Periphas (Ancient Greek: Περίφᾱς Períphās means 'conspicuousness') in Greek mythology may refer to:

Periphas, a legendary king of Attica who Zeus turned into an eagle, husband of Phene.
Periphas, an Egyptian prince as one of the sons of King Aegyptus. His mother was Gorgo and thus full brother of Oeneus, Aegyptus, Menalces, Lampus and Idmon. In some accounts, he could be a son of Aegyptus either by Eurryroe, daughter of the river-god Nilus, or Isaia, daughter of King Agenor of Tyre. Periphas suffered the same fate as his other brothers, save Lynceus, when they were slain on their wedding night by their wives who obeyed the command of their father King Danaus of Libya. He married the Danaid Actaea, daughter of Danaus and Pieria.
Periphas, one of the five sons of Aretus who fought against Dionysus in the Indian War.
Periphas, a Aetolian prince as son of King Oeneus of Calydon and Althaea, daughter of King Thestius of Pleuron. He was the brother of Meleager, Phereus, Ageleus, Toxeus, Clymenus, Gorge, Eurymede, Deianira and Melanippe.
Periphas, a son of Lapithes and Orsinome in Thessaly. He consorted with Astyagyia, daughter of Hypseus, and had by her eight sons, of whom the eldest, Antion was a possible father of Ixion with Perimela.
Periphas, one of the Lapiths at the wedding of Pirithous and Hippodamia. He must not be confused with the above-mentioned Periphas who was also a Lapith.
Periphas, same as Hyperphas.
 Periphas, son of the Aetolian Ochesius, fell by the hand of Ares in the Trojan war.
 Periphas, a companion of Neoptolemus who took part in the destruction of Troy.
Periphas, one of the sons of King Aeolus of Lipara, the keeper of the winds. He had five brothers namely: Agenor, Euchenor, Klymenos, Xouthos and Macareus, and six sisters: Klymene, Kallithyia, Eurygone, Lysidike, Kanake and an unnamed one. According to various accounts, Aeolus yoked in marriage his sons, including Periphas, and daughters in order to preserve concord and affection among them.
Periphas, one of the Suitors of Penelope who came from Zacynthus along with other 43 wooers. He, with the other suitors, was shot dead by Odysseus with the aid of Eumaeus, Philoetius, and Telemachus.
Periphas, a son of Epytus, and a herald of Aeneas.

Notes

References 

 Antoninus Liberalis, The Metamorphoses of Antoninus Liberalis translated by Francis Celoria (Routledge 1992). Online version at the Topos Text Project.
Apollodorus, The Library with an English Translation by Sir James George Frazer, F.B.A., F.R.S. in 2 Volumes, Cambridge, MA, Harvard University Press; London, William Heinemann Ltd. 1921. ISBN 0-674-99135-4. Online version at the Perseus Digital Library. Greek text available from the same website.
 Diodorus Siculus, The Library of History translated by Charles Henry Oldfather. Twelve volumes. Loeb Classical Library. Cambridge, Massachusetts: Harvard University Press; London: William Heinemann, Ltd. 1989. Vol. 3. Books 4.59–8. Online version at Bill Thayer's Web Site
 Diodorus Siculus, Bibliotheca Historica. Vol 1-2. Immanel Bekker. Ludwig Dindorf. Friedrich Vogel. in aedibus B. G. Teubneri. Leipzig. 1888–1890. Greek text available at the Perseus Digital Library.
 Homer, The Iliad with an English Translation by A.T. Murray, Ph.D. in two volumes. Cambridge, MA., Harvard University Press; London, William Heinemann, Ltd. 1924. . Online version at the Perseus Digital Library.
Homer, Homeri Opera in five volumes. Oxford, Oxford University Press. 1920. . Greek text available at the Perseus Digital Library.
 Homer, The Odyssey with an English Translation by A.T. Murray, PH.D. in two volumes. Cambridge, MA., Harvard University Press; London, William Heinemann, Ltd. 1919. . Online version at the Perseus Digital Library. Greek text available from the same website.
Nonnus of Panopolis, Dionysiaca translated by William Henry Denham Rouse (1863-1950), from the Loeb Classical Library, Cambridge, MA, Harvard University Press, 1940.  Online version at the Topos Text Project.
 Nonnus of Panopolis, Dionysiaca. 3 Vols. W.H.D. Rouse. Cambridge, MA., Harvard University Press; London, William Heinemann, Ltd. 1940–1942. Greek text available at the Perseus Digital Library.
 Publius Ovidius Naso, Metamorphoses translated by Brookes More (1859-1942). Boston, Cornhill Publishing Co. 1922. Online version at the Perseus Digital Library.
 Publius Ovidius Naso, Metamorphoses. Hugo Magnus. Gotha (Germany). Friedr. Andr. Perthes. 1892. Latin text available at the Perseus Digital Library.
 Publius Vergilius Maro, Aeneid. Theodore C. Williams. trans. Boston. Houghton Mifflin Co. 1910. Online version at the Perseus Digital Library.
 Publius Vergilius Maro, Bucolics, Aeneid, and Georgics. J. B. Greenough. Boston. Ginn & Co. 1900. Latin text available at the Perseus Digital Library.
Tzetzes, John, Allegories of the Odyssey translated by Goldwyn, Adam J. and Kokkini, Dimitra. Dumbarton Oaks Medieval Library, Harvard University Press, 2015. 

Achaeans (Homer)
Princes in Greek mythology
Suitors of Penelope
Aetolian characters in Greek mythology
Lapiths in Greek mythology
es:Perifas
ja:ペーネイオス